The Government of the Republic of Kazakhstan (Qazaqstan Respublikasynyñ Ükımetı) oversees a presidential republic. The President of Kazakhstan, currently Kassym-Jomart Tokayev, is head of state and nominates the Prime Minister of Kazakhstan, the head of government. Executive power is exercised by the government. Legislative power is vested in both the government and the two chambers of parliament.

According to the 2016 World Development report prepared by the World Bank Group, Kazakhstan ranks 28th among 193 countries in the e-Gov development rating. The "Information Kazakhstan – 2020" state program approved in 2013 helped the country transition to the information society.

The latest formation, the Mamin Cabinet, resigned on 5 January 2022 after mass rioting and unrest in the country.

Executive branch

|President
|Kassym-Jomart Tokayev
|Nur Otan
|20 March 2019
|-
|Prime Minister
|Alihan Smaiylov
|Nur Otan
|5 January 2022
|}

President

The president is elected by popular vote for a five-year term. The prime minister and first deputy prime minister are appointed by the president. The Council of Ministers is also appointed by the president. Then-president Nursultan Nazarbayev expanded his presidential powers by decree: only he can initiate constitutional amendments, appoint and dismiss the government, dissolve Parliament, call referendums at his discretion, and appoint administrative heads of regions and cities.

The president is the head of state and commander-in-chief of the armed forces and may veto legislation that has been passed by the Parliament.

Prime Minister 

The prime minister, who serves at the pleasure of the president, chairs the Council of Ministers and serves as Kazakhstan's head of government. There are three deputy prime ministers and 17 ministers in the Council. The most recent Prime Minister of the Republic of Kazakhstan is Älihan Smaiylov.

Agencies and committees
Kazakhstan's National Security Committee (NSC) was established on 13 June 1992. It includes the Service of Internal Security, Military Counterintelligence, Border Guard, several Commandos units, and Foreign Intelligence (Barlau). The latter is considered by many as the most important part of NSC. Its director is former Prime Minister Karim Massimov.

Legislative branch
The legislature, known as the Parliament (Parlamenti), has two chambers.

Assembly 
The Assembly (Majilis) has 77 seats, elected for a four-year term, 67 in single seat constituencies and 10 by proportional representation. Mazhilis deputies and the government both have the right of legislative initiative, though most legislation considered by the Parliament is proposed by the government.

Senate 
The Senate (Senat) has 47 members, 40 of whom are elected for six-year terms in double-seat constituencies by the local assemblies, half renewed every two years, and 7 presidential appointees. In addition, former presidents are ex officio senators for life.

Judicial branch
There are 65 judges on the Supreme Court of the Republic of Kazakhstan, which sits on top of the judicial hierarchy. Kazakhstan's judiciary also consists of courts of general jurisdiction, criminal courts, which handle grave crimes, juvenile courts, economic courts, administrative offenses courts, and administrative justice courts (the last of which was created in 2021). There are eight members of the Constitutional Council, including the member-for-life Leader of the Nation First President of the Republic of Kazakhstan Nursultan Nazarbayev, even though formally the Council is not a part of the judicial branch. With regard to the legal profession, the Republican Collegiate was created in 2012 and it represents Kazakhstan's lawyers' associations on the national level.

Administrative divisions
Kazakhstan is divided into 14 regions and the three municipal districts of Almaty, Astana, and Shymkent. Each is headed by an Akim (provincial governor) appointed by the president. Municipal Akims are appointed by Province Akims. The Government of Kazakhstan transferred its capital from Almaty to Astana on 10 June 1998. The Province or oblystar (singular — oblys) and cities (kalalar, singular — kala)* are : Almaty (Taldykorgan), Almaty*, Akmola (Kokshetau), Astana*, Aktobe (Aktobe), Atyrau (Atyrau), West Kazakhstan (Oral), Baykonur*, Mangystau (Aktau), South Kazakhstan (Shymkent), Pavlodar (Pavlodar), Karagandy (Karaganda), Kostanay (Kostanay), Kyzylorda (Kyzylorda), East Kazakhstan (Oskemen), North Kazakhstan (Petropavl), Zhambyl (Taraz). The administrative divisions have the same names as their administrative centers (exceptions have the administrative center name following in parentheses); in 1995 the Governments of Kazakhstan and Russia entered into an agreement whereby Russia would lease for a period of 20 years an area of  enclosing the Baikonur space launch facilities and the city of Baikonur.

References

External links 

 Government of Kazakhstan  (English)
 U.S. Relations With Kazakhstan at the US Department of State